The title of Duke of Urach (German: Herzog von Urach) was created in the Kingdom of Württemberg on 28 March 1867 for Friedrich Wilhelm Alexander Ferdinand, Count of Württemberg, with the style of Serene Highness. The first Duke of Urach was the first head of the House of Urach.

Family

Wilhelm, 1st Duke of Urach, was the son of Duke Wilhelm of Württemberg (1761-1830) and his morganatic wife, Baroness (Freiin) Wilhelmine von Tunderfeldt-Rhodis (1777-1822), whom he married at Coswig on 23 August 1800. His paternal grandfather was Duke Friedrich II Eugen (1732-1797), from whom all claimants to the Kingdom of Württemberg are descended. Because of his first marriage to Théodolinde de Beauharnais, the first Duke had converted to Roman Catholicism. 

His second marriage to Her Serene Highness Princess Florestine of Monaco in 1863 led in part to Wilhelm's elevation in 1867 from being a Count of Wurttemberg to Duke (Herzog) von Urach. He had served the Kingdom well in his career, and the dukedom of 1867 elevated him to his wife's rank of Serene Highness.

The 2nd Duke of Urach was briefly chosen as Mindaugas II, King of Lithuania in 1918. In the same year the Monaco Succession Crisis of 1918 ended his claim through his mother to the throne of Monaco. 

The family still owns Lichtenstein Castle, rebuilt by the first duke in the 1840s.

Dukes of Urach (1867)

 Wilhelm, 1st Duke of Urach (1810-1869)
 Wilhelm, 2nd Duke of Urach (1864-1928)
 Karl Gero, 3rd Duke of Urach (1899-1981)
 Karl Anselm, 4th Duke of Urach (born 1955), renounced the dukedom in 1991
 Wilhelm Albert, 5th Duke of Urach (born 1957)
 Heir apparent: Prince Karl Philipp of Urach (born 1992)

All legal privileges of the nobility were officially abolished in 1919 by the Weimar Republic (1919-1933), and nobility is no longer conferred or recognised by the Federal Republic of Germany, former hereditary titles being allowed only as part of the surname.

See also
 Coat of arms of Württemberg
 History of Württemberg
 Uradel
 Duke of Teck

External links
Website of the Urach family 
The von Urach family's archive in Stuttgart